The Mouvement des entreprises de France (MEDEF), or the Movement of the Enterprises of France, is the largest employer federation in France. Established in 1998, it replaced the Conseil national du patronat Français (CNPF), or the "National Council of the French Employers", which was founded in 1946.

It has more than 750,000 member firms, 90 percent of them being small and medium enterprises (SMEs) with fewer than 50 employees. MEDEF is engaged in lobbying at local, regional, national, and EU-wide levels.

Every year, MEDEF International organises a number of delegations of French business leaders with tangible projects to targeted countries, especially developing countries. MEDEF espouses “sustainable development”, raising companies’ awareness to the fact that environmental protection can also feature among their competitive advantages.

Its current president, is Geoffroy Roux de Bézieux as of July 2018.

See also 

Union of Industrial and Employers' Confederations of Europe (UNICE)
Union des industries et métiers de la métallurgie (UIMM)
Lisbon Agenda

References

External links
Official site of the MEDEF

Employers' organizations
Business organizations based in France
1998 establishments in France
Organizations established in 1998
Organizations based in Paris